The Governor of the Central Bank of Malaysia is the chief executive of Malaysia's central bank and the ex-officio chairperson of its Central Board of Directors. Malaysian ringgit currency notes, issued by the Central Bank of Malaysia (BNM), bear the governor's signature. Since its establishment in 1959, the BNM has been headed by 9 governors.

Section 15 (1) of the Central Bank of Malaysia Act 2009 states that the Governor is appointed by Yang di-Pertuan Agong, the Supreme Head of Malaysia whilst the Deputy Governor is appointed by the Finance Minister. Section 15 (4) of the Central Bank of Malaysia Act 2009 states that the term of office typically runs for 5 years for the Governor and 3 years for the Deputy Governor, both eligible for reappointment. 

The 9th and current Governor is Nor Shamsiah Mohd Yunus, who took over from Muhammad Ibrahim on 1 July 2018.

List of the governors

References

Central Bank of Malaysia
Governors of the Central Bank of Malaysia